The (Hagelin) C-52 and CX-52 were cipher machines manufactured by Crypto AG starting 1951/1952. These pin-and-lug type cipher machines were advanced successors of the C-38/M-209. The machine measures . The device is mechanical, but when combined with an electric keyboard attachment, the B-52, the resultant system is termed the BC-52.

The Hell 54 was a licensed copy of the C-52 by German company Hell.

Structure and operation 

Both C and CX models are equipped with six pinwheels. In the C-52 version, these six wheels are chosen from a possible set of 12, with the number of pins on each wheel  being 25, 26, 29, 31, 34, 37, 38, 41, 42, 43, 46, and 47. The C model had a fixed stepping system with a large wheel cycle due to the mutually prime factors in the pin counts. The CX-52 version has 6 pinwheels with 47 pins each and a flexible wheel movement system. The lug cage of both models contains 32 movable bars: 27 of the bars are used for encryption and the remaining 5 bars control the stepping of the pinwheels. The early CX models used the control bars also for encryption but due to complications in creating acceptable lug settings later CX models used these bars only for controlling of the wheel stepping. The stepping of the CX wheels was controlled by adjustable lugs on the control bars.

The C-52 and CX-52 were very flexible machines that could be produced in various ways, creating a unique machine with unique cryptographic characteristics for each customer. There were special detachable wheel movement bars and their position on the drum could change, interchangeable print wheels, custom pinwheel labels, versions with One-time Tape reader instead of wheels, versions that only enciphered numbers, and many other details that influenced the enciphering process.

Breaking and compromising 

There is some speculation that the CX-52 might have been broken by communist signals intelligence services of East Germany, Czechoslovakia and Poland.

Many of the C-52 and CX-52 machines sold by Crypto AG were compromised to benefit the US and British national signals intelligence agencies, National Security Agency (NSA) and Government Communications Headquarters (GCHQ), respectively. For details, see Crypto AG § Compromised machines.

See also
 Operation Rubicon (Crypto AG)
M-209
 C-36 (cipher machine)
 CD-57

Notes and references

External links

 H. Paul Greenough, Cryptanalysis of the Hagelin C-52 and similar machines a known plaintext attack, Cryptologia, 23(2), July 1999, pp139–156.
 Louis Kruh, The Hagelin Cryptographer, Type C-52, Cryptologia 3(2), April 1979, pp78–82.
 Jan Bury, From the Archives: CX-52 Messages Read by Red Poles?, Cryptologia 33(4), October 2009, pp347–352.
 Jan Bury, Polish Cold War Codebreaking of 1959–1989: A Preliminary Assessment, Cryptologia 36(4), October 2012, pp341–379.
 Technical details of the C-52 and CX-52 Encryption principle and machine variations, by Dirk Rijmenants
 Dirk Rijmenants' Hagelin BC-52 Simulator
 The HAGELIN cryptographer CX-52 by Torbjorn Andersson — a write-up, photograph and a QBASIC simulator.
 Jerry Proc's page on the CX-52 — also covers the B-52 keyboard unit.
 Jerry Proc's page on the Hell 54 — a licensed copy of the C-52 by Hell
 Descriptions from sales of C-52 and CX-52 equipment
 CX-52 Cryptographic Machine & B-52 Motorized Base
 CX-52-related Stasi files

Encryption devices